The Terrick Terrick National Park is a national park located in the  region of Victoria, Australia. The national park is an important remnant of Box-Ironbark forests and northern grass plains and is close to Kow Swamp, the site of a major palaeontological find providing insight into the origins of Indigenous Australians. There are many walking tracks and one basic campground. Drinking water is not available in the park and must be carried.

Terrick Terrick National Park is one of the last remaining strongholds for the Plains-wanderer, an endangered Australian endemic bird species. The park is part of the Patho Plains Important Bird Area, so identified by BirdLife International principally because of its importance for the conservation of Plains-wanderers.

The minimum elevation of the terrain is 82m, and the maximum is 196m.

See also 

 Protected areas of Victoria
 Delma impar, the striped legless lizard
 Sminthopsis crassicaudata, the fat-tailed dunnart
 List of reduplicated Australian place names

References

External links 
 Terrick Terrick on Google Maps

National parks of Victoria (Australia)
Protected areas established in 1999
1999 establishments in Australia
Box-ironbark forest